Jeremy Dashon Kerley (born November 8, 1988) is a former American football wide receiver and return specialist. He played college football at TCU and was drafted by the New York Jets in the fifth round of the 2011 NFL Draft and has also had stints with the Detroit Lions, San Francisco 49ers, and Buffalo Bills.

Early years
Kerley attended Hutto High School in Hutto, Texas, where he was a letterman in four sports, Kerley took his high school football team to the state finals in 2005 where he and his team faced Tatum and lost by three points despite a great game performance by Kerley. His letterman included football and baseball. He played pitcher and centerfielder in baseball. At quarterback, Kerley led his football team to its first state championship game as a junior.

As a standout track athlete, Kerley was one of the state's top performers in the jumping events. He was a four-time state finalist in the triple jump. He qualified for the state track meet in the long jump (7.26 m) and triple jump (14.76 m), winning silver medals in both events. He was also a member of the 4 × 100 m and 4 × 400 m relay teams.

He was recruited by the University of Texas and Stanford University to play baseball, and by the University of Oklahoma to play football, but ultimately decided to play college football for Texas Christian University.

College career
Kerley was converted to wide receiver and return specialist at TCU after playing quarterback in high school. Following the 2009 season, Kerley was named Mountain West Conference Special Teams Player of the Year after breaking the conference record for punt return yards in a season with 563 yards. He had ten touchdown catches, one touchdown pass, and two rushing touchdowns in 2010. He ranked second in the nation in punt returns and third in the nation in kickoff returns.

He was named the Mountain West Conference Special Teams Player of the Year for the second consecutive year in 2010, as well as second-team All-Mountain West honors at wide receiver. Kerley was one of three finalists in 2010 for the Paul Hornung Award, which honors the most versatile college football player in the nation.

Professional career
Kerley was projected to be drafted in the fifth round of the 2011 NFL Draft.

New York Jets
Kerley was selected in the fifth round with the 153rd overall pick of the 2011 NFL Draft by the New York Jets. He caught his first career touchdown pass from Mark Sanchez against the New England Patriots on October 9, 2011.

During the home opener against the Buffalo Bills on September 9, 2012, Kerley recorded his first career punt return touchdown. After Tim Tebow requested to be removed from the wildcat formation, Kerley took his place, and threw a 42-yard pass, though the Jets lost to the San Diego Chargers 17–27.

On October 21, 2014, Kerley agreed to a 4-year, $16 million contract extension with $5.4 million guaranteed.

Kerley ended the 2015 season with career-highs in punt returns (48) and punt return yards (411).

On March 9, 2016, Kerley was released by the Jets.

Detroit Lions
On March 21, 2016, Kerley signed a one-year deal with the Detroit Lions.

San Francisco 49ers
On August 29, 2016, the Lions traded Kerley to the San Francisco 49ers in exchange for guard Brandon Thomas.

Kerley agreed to a three-year, $10.5 million contract extension on March 4, 2017. On September 2, 2017, Kerley was released by the 49ers.

New York Jets (second stint)
On September 5, 2017, Kerley re-signed with the Jets on a one-year deal. On November 6, 2017, Kerley was suspended for 4 games due to a PED violation. He was released by the Jets on December 18, 2017 after being reinstated from suspension.

Buffalo Bills
On April 16, 2018, Kerley signed a one-year contract with the Buffalo Bills. He was released by the Bills on September 15, 2018.

Career statistics

Personal life
Kerley's parents are Charlotte and Donald Kerley. Kerley is married to Kristal Juarez and they have three kids, Dae'shon, Y'manni, and Ma'liyah. Kerley's younger cousin is Olympic silver-medalist sprinter and 2022 World Athletics Champion Fred Kerley.

References

External links
New York Jets bio
TCU Horned Frogs bio

1988 births
Living people
People from Williamson County, Texas
Players of American football from Texas
American football quarterbacks
American football wide receivers
American football return specialists
TCU Horned Frogs football players
New York Jets players
Detroit Lions players
San Francisco 49ers players
Buffalo Bills players